Maxates centrophylla is a moth of the family Geometridae. It is known from Australia, including Tasmania.

Adults are pale brown with dark speckles forming indistinct zig-zag lines. There is a dark spot near the centre of the wings. The forewings each have a pointed apex and a recurved margin. The hindwing margins are angled.

The larvae have been recorded feeding on Aotus ericoides.

References

Hemitheini
Moths described in 1888